Valley of the Gods is a 2019 English-language Polish-Luxembourger drama film written and directed by Lech Majewski and starring Josh Hartnett and John Malkovich.

Plot
John Ecas (Josh Hartnett) arrives at the Valley of the Gods, in SE Utah near Monument Valley, where the spirits of Navajo deities dwell within enormous stones. He is a copywriter whose life collapsed when his wife (Jaime Ray Newman) left him. As a cure, his therapist (John Rhys-Davies) suggested him doing crazy things. Having done that, he decided to write The Great American Novel. The film visualizes what he writes.

Enter Wes Tauros (John Malkovich), the world's richest man, gone mute after a tragedy. He wants to mine the Valley of the Gods for uranium. The Navajos split between those who want the money and those upset at the desecration of holy ground. Ecas turns up at Tauros' estate in order to write his biography but, once there, he finds peculiar things.

There are intertwining threads centered on Tauros, Ecas, the Navajos, and The Old Gods. The storyline brims with admiration for the Navajos, and utter disdain for both the vulgar avarice of Tauros and the all-consuming consumerism of society at large.

Cast
Josh Hartnett as John Ecas
Bérénice Marlohe as Karen Kitson
John Malkovich as Wes Tauros
John Rhys-Davies as Dr. Hermann
Jaime Ray Newman as Laura Ecas
Keir Dullea as Ulim

References

External links
 

Polish drama films
Films scored by Jan A. P. Kaczmarek
Films directed by Lech Majewski
2010s English-language films